The 2005 Australian Grand Prix (officially the 2005 Formula 1 Foster's Australian Grand Prix) was a Formula One motor race held at the Melbourne Grand Prix Circuit on 6 March 2005. It was the first round of the 2005 Formula One season. The 58-lap race was won by Renault driver Giancarlo Fisichella after he started from pole position. Rubens Barrichello finished second for the Ferrari team and Fisichella's team-mate Fernando Alonso came in third.

Friday drivers 
The bottom 6 teams in the 2004 Constructors' Championship were entitled to run a third car in free practice on Friday. These drivers drove on Friday but did not compete in qualifying or the race.

Report

Practice
The first practice session of the 2005 Australian Grand Prix was dominated by Vitantonio Liuzzi who was appearing at his first grand prix for Red Bull at their first race. Twenty-two cars participated with reserve drivers Pedro de la Rosa for McLaren, Ricardo Zonta for Toyota, Robert Doornbos for Jordan and Liuzzi for Red Bull. Neither of the Minardis ran. Juan Pablo Montoya was fourth fastest while Rubens Barrichello was only 12th. Michael Schumacher didn't participate in this session. The only casualty was Narain Karthikeyan for Jordan whose engine blew up after 6 laps.

Pedro de la Rosa and Kimi Räikkönen put their McLarens fastest in the second session just ahead of Nick Heidfeld and Michael Schumacher. Juan Pablo Montoya was left fifth with a happy Felipe Massa sixth. The main drama was Vitantonio Liuzzi's spin at turn three which left him in the gravel and he had to abandon the car. Narain Karthikeyan was hit with a fine with him speeding in the pit lane during his first ever outing in the last practice session with a speed of 86.2 km/h his fine was US$6750. Once again both Minardis didn't take part.

After the overnight rain in Australia the track was wet for the start of the third practice session with the Ferraris of Michael Schumacher and Rubens Barrichello leading the way ahead of Kimi Räikkönen in the McLaren. Both Minardis got to run but Christijan Albers spun on his final lap at Turn 3. Neither of the Sauber, Williams or Renault drivers set lap times but Christian Klien and Juan Pablo Montoya did go out as did Mark Webber but spun twice on his only lap.

The final session got underway and the dampness of the track led to times all over the place but Kimi Räikkönen and Fernando Alonso did well to fight for fastest with the Finn coming out best. Juan Pablo Montoya put in a last gasp lap for 3rd ahead of Giancarlo Fisichella and Jenson Button. Another drama for Narain Karthikeyan as he spun at turn nine and had to abandon his car before it briefly caught fire.

Qualifying

Prior to the session several teams' weather forecasts predicted a rain storm after 20 minutes. To begin with the track was merely damp after the early morning rain. The session was run the reverse order of the 2004 Brazilian Grand Prix as Christijan Albers shaded teammate Patrick Friesacher to set fastest time. Despite spinning in Turn 12 on his out lap, Narain Karthikeyan went 5 seconds faster than the Minardis with his teammate following behind.

Jenson Button had been an early retirement in Interlagos the previous year, so he had to go out fifth and quickly went fastest with a 1m 41.512. Williams drivers Nick Heidfeld and Mark Webber beat Button's time with 1m 39.717 and a 1m 36.717 respectively. Christian Klien moved to second place before Jarno Trulli put his Toyota on pole with a 1m 35.270.

A disappointing 1m 38.320 for David Coulthard in the Red Bull, the Scot was complaining of poor balance. Jacques Villeneuve was the first man to put on the dry tyre but it looked like he'd got it wrong as he spun wildly on his out lap. He brought his Sauber home for 3rd place before Giancarlo Fisichella put in a 1m 33.171 to take fastest time before the rain.

The torrential rain arrived just as Felipe Massa started his flying lap on the dry tyre, he had to abort his lap and had to settle for 20th. Michael Schumacher switched to his wet Bridgestone tyre and the 7 time world champion could only do a 1m 57.931 to put him 18th after all the drivers finished.

The session had to be stopped when Takuma Sato in the BAR crashed at Turn 8 on his out lap. When the session resumed the conditions had slightly improved and Ralf Schmacher's lap put him 17th. Fernando Alonso settled for 14th and Rubens Barrichello qualified 12th.

Last out were Juan Pablo Montoya and Kimi Räikkönen (McLaren teammates), but both had to fight for 10th and 11th fastest on the list.

Race
The first attempt to start the race was yellow flagged, due to the stalled McLaren of Kimi Räikkönen, who would eventually start the abbreviated race (57 laps from 58) in pit lane. When the red lights did finally go out, front row starters Fisichella and Jarno Trulli protected their positions and led the rest of the field through the first lap. Starting third in his home grand prix, Mark Webber– in his Williams debut– was outsprinted to the first corner by David Coulthard's Red Bull. Rubens Barrichello and Fernando Alonso each moved up three spots on the first lap, showing more of their cars' true potential than what was seen in the rain-soaked qualifying. Sato made the best start, moving from last place to 14th. Jacques Villeneuve had the worst start– his first in the Sauber– as he dropped five positions on the opening lap after losing forward momentum in a first-corner position skirmish.

As Fisichella and Trulli raced away at the front, Coulthard began to gradually fall back, holding up Webber, Nick Heidfeld (also making his Williams debut), Christian Klien, Juan Pablo Montoya and Barrichello. Several seconds further back was Villeneuve, struggling to hold off a charging Alonso, who was himself just ahead of Jenson Button and Ralf Schumacher (in his first start for Toyota). Close behind were Felipe Massa, Sato, the elder Schumacher, and Räikkönen, who doggedly pursued the champion but could not find a way past. The four rookies were a little further back: the two Jordans of Tiago Monteiro and Narain Karthikeyan led the Minardi duo of Patrick Friesacher and Christijan Albers.

Alonso passed Villeneuve, only to have the Canadian retake the position moments later. But just before the first round of pit stops, Alonso would finally find a way around the former champion, saving any podium hopes for the young Spaniard. While passing backmarkers on lap 15, Coulthard and Webber nearly collided with one another; Webber briefly went onto the grass, but no serious damage was done. After lap 17, unable to pull out of the pits due to a gearbox problem, Albers retired his Minardi, which had lost second gear as early as the formation lap. This was the only mechanical retirement of the afternoon.

Fisichella remained firmly in command after his first pit stop, although he briefly relinquished the lead while refueling. Barrichello gained the most in the pits, as he moved up from eighth to fourth place; Alonso continued his hard charge, gaining four positions as well. However, Trulli's Toyota slowly began dropping back, getting passed again and again; it would later turn out to be a blistered rear tyre, which would affect him for the remainder of the race. Teammate Ralf Schumacher had a problem of his own, and was forced to pit twice in quick succession to tighten a loose safety harness. Räikkönen was able to get by the elder Schumacher into tenth (his starting grid position) and pull away from the champion in pursuit of Heidfeld.

After Michael Schumacher's second stop, he emerged from the pitlane just ahead of Heidfeld, who thought he saw an opening going into the third turn. Schumacher, who momentarily lost sight of Heidfeld's Williams in his mirrors, closed the door on his fellow German, forcing him onto the grass. With no traction on the grass, Heidfeld braked in vain, sliding into the side of the F2004M, pushing both cars into the gravel. Heidfeld's race was finished; although Schumacher was able to get his Ferrari back on track, nevertheless he retired in the pits soon thereafter, due to collision damage.

Montoya went onto the grass briefly at Turn Eight as he prepared to make his second pit stop; this, plus another off-track excursion while tangling with a backmarking rookie, cost him valuable time. When he later lost part of his rear deflector, Montoya eased up to finish the race and to preserve his Mercedes-Benz power plant for the next race. Teammate Räikkönen also lost a significant portion of his deflector, which became embedded under his side barge board; mechanics were later seen removing it during a pit stop.

After the second round of stops, the final order of finish was nearly determined. While most of the field slowed to conserve their engines, Alonso continued pushing hard on Barrichello's heels. Barrichello, despite battling a brake balance problem, was able to answer the challenge, and held off Alonso for second. He never put a foot wrong, and his R25 chassis, although not seriously challenged, performed flawlessly to claim the inaugural race of the season. Teammate Alonso clocked the fastest lap of the race, and was noticeably the fastest car on track for most of the event.

Both BARs pulled into the pits on the final lap of the race; by not officially finishing the event, they effectively exempted themselves from the new two-race engine rule. By taking advantage of this loophole in 2005 regulations, they were entitled to replace the cars' Honda engines in Malaysia without incurring any penalty. The loophole was immediately closed, as a car was in future required to have a genuine technical problem to be entitled to a new engine.

Classification

Qualifying

Race

 Räikkönen would start the race from the pit lane.

Championship standings after the race 

Drivers' Championship standings

Constructors' Championship standings

Note: Only the top five positions are included for both sets of standings.

References

External links

Grand Prix
Australian Grand Prix
Australian Grand Prix
Australian Grand Prix